The 1986 World Men's Handball Championship was the 11th team handball World Championship. It was held in Switzerland from February 25 to March 8, 1986. Yugoslavia won the championship. The tournament was played in Aarau, Basel, Bern, La Chaux-de-Fonds, Davos, Geneva, Luzern, Olten, St. Gallen, Solothurn, Winterthur and Zürich.

Qualification

Teams

Preliminary round

Group A

Group B

Group C

Group D

Ranking round

Main round

Group I

Group II

Final round

Eleventh place game

Ninth place game

Seventh place game

Fifth place game

Third place game

Final

Final standings

Medal summary

Top goalscorers

External links
IHF Report
Men Handball World Championship 1986
Dataesport
The Official Website of the Beijing 2008 Olympic Games - Medallists from previous World Championships

World Handball Championship tournaments
World Mens Handball Championship, 1986
H
1986 in Swiss sport
February 1986 sports events in Europe
March 1986 sports events in Europe
20th century in Bern
20th century in Basel
20th century in Zürich
20th century in Geneva
Sport in Davos
Sports competitions in Zürich
Sports competitions in Bern
Sports competitions in Basel
Sports competitions in Geneva